William Frederic Kay,  (May 18, 1876 – May 8, 1942) was a Canadian politician.

Born in Montreal, Quebec, he was first elected to the House of Commons of Canada representing the Quebec riding of Missisquoi in the 1911 federal election. A Liberal, he was re-elected in 1917, 1921, 1925, and 1926. In June 1930, he was appointed a Minister without Portfolio in the cabinet of MacKenzie King. He was defeated in the July 1930 federal election.

References
 

1876 births
1942 deaths
Liberal Party of Canada MPs
Laurier Liberals
Members of the House of Commons of Canada from Quebec
Members of the King's Privy Council for Canada
Politicians from Montreal